Wei, known in historiography as Zhai Wei, was a dynastic state of China ruled by the Dingling people that existed from 388 to 392, during the Sixteen Kingdoms period of Chinese history. Its founder Zhai Liao had previously been vacillating between being a vassal of the Later Yan, Western Yan, and Eastern Jin dynasties, and in 388, after his last overture to reconcile with Later Yan's emperor Murong Chui was rejected, he founded his own dynasty, over the territory of modern central and eastern Henan. In 392, Zhai Wei, then under Zhai Liao's son Zhai Zhao, was destroyed by Later Yan forces. Because of its relatively small size and short lifespan, Zhai Wei is not included by historians among the Sixteen Kingdoms.

The rulers of Zhai Wei used the title "Heavenly King" (Tian Wang).

Rulers of Wei

Family tree

See also 
 Ethnic groups in Chinese history

References 
 
 

 
388 establishments
392 disestablishments
4th-century establishments in China
4th-century disestablishments in China
Former countries in Chinese history
Dynasties in Chinese history